The Independent Spirit Award for Best Female Lead was one of the annual Independent Spirit Awards to honor an actress who has delivered an outstanding lead performance in an independent film. It was first presented in 1985 with Geraldine Page being the first recipient of the award for her role as Carrie Watts in The Trip to Bountiful. It was last presented in 2022 with Taylour Paige being the final recipient of the award for her role in Zola.

In 2022, it was announced that the four acting categories would be retired and replaced with two gender neutral categories, with both Best Male Lead and Best Female Lead merging into the Best Lead Performance category. 

With two wins, Frances McDormand and Julianne Moore are the most awarded females in this category, while with 4 nominations Michelle Williams is the most nominated female in this category.

Winners and nominees

1980s

1990s

2000s

2010s

2020s

Multiple nominees

2 nominations
 Annette Bening
 Cate Blanchett
 Laura Dern
 Brie Larson
 Jennifer Lawrence
 Jennifer Jason Leigh
 Laura Linney
 Elisabeth Moss
 Carey Mulligan
 Natalie Portman
 Parker Posey
 Tilda Swinton
 Lili Taylor
 Alfre Woodard
 Joanne Woodward
 Robin Wright
 Renée Zellweger

3 nominations
 Catherine Keener
 Frances McDormand
 Julianne Moore

4 nominations
 Michelle Williams

Multiple winners
2 wins
 Frances McDormand
 Julianne Moore

See also
 Academy Award for Best Actress
 Critics' Choice Movie Award for Best Actress
 BAFTA Award for Best Actress in a Leading Role
 Golden Globe Award for Best Actress in a Motion Picture – Drama
 Golden Globe Award for Best Actress – Motion Picture Comedy or Musical
 Screen Actors Guild Award for Outstanding Performance by a Female Actor in a Leading Role

References

External links
Every BEST FEMALE LEAD winner ever video on the official Film Independent channel

Female
 
Film awards for lead actress